Cobe or COBE may refer to:

 Cobe (architectural firm), a Danish architectural firm
 Cosmic Background Explorer (COBE), a satellite
 9997 COBE, a main-belt asteroid
 Cobe Trophy Race, an auto race held in 1910 and 1911

People with the name
 Harry Cobe (1885–1966), American racecar driver
 Cobe Jones (1907–1969), Major League Baseball player

See also
 Cobi (disambiguation)
 Coby (disambiguation)
 Kobe (disambiguation)